Tobias Hildebrand (born 20 October 1975) is a retired Swedish tennis player.

Hildebrand has a career high ATP singles ranking of 394 achieved on 29 September 1997. He also has a career high doubles ranking of 190 achieved on 5 July 1999.

Hildebrand has won 2 ATP Challenger doubles titles at the 1998 Tampere Open and the 1998 Scheveningen Challenger.

Tour titles

Doubles

References

External links
 
 

1975 births
Living people
Swedish male tennis players
20th-century Swedish people